Alfred Agim Ajdarević (born 20 June 1998) is a Kosovo Albanian professional footballer who plays as a midfielder.

Early life
Alfred was born in Sweden, to Kosovar-Albanian parents with origin from Medveđa, where they moved like family from Pristina, Kosovo to Sweden in 1992. The family real name was Hajdari but since his father played in Yugoslav league they switched it to "Ajdarević". His father Agim Ajdarević was a member of FK Spartak Subotica in the Yugoslav First League in the 1980s and 1990s, and later when Agim moved to Sweden in 1992, he signed with Falkenbergs FF. His elder brother Astrit was also part of Falkenbergs FF such as their father and also started youth career at Rinia IF. His other elder brother, Arben is also a footballer.

Club career

Early career
Ajdarević started his youth career at Rinia IF from where he moved at Falkenbergs FF. Then on 5 July 2016 he signed with Örebro SK joining his elder brother Astrit Ajdarević.

Örebro
He was included in the first team of Örebro SK for the match against his former team Falkenbergs on 23 July 2016 where he was an unused substitute for the entire match. He made his first professional debut on 6 November 2016 against Elfsborg coming on as a substitute in the 76th minute in place of Maic Sema.

On 28 January 2019, Ajdarević was loaned out to IFK Värnamo for the whole 2019 season.

On 30 June 2021, Ajdarević left Örebro.

International career
Ajdarević received his first international call-up at Albania national under-21 football team by coach Alban Bushi for a gathering in Durrës, Albania from 18–25 January 2017.

Career statistics

Club

References

External links 
 
 

1998 births
Living people
Albanian men's footballers
Albania youth international footballers
Albania under-21 international footballers
Swedish footballers
Kosovo Albanians
Swedish people of Albanian descent
Swedish people of Kosovan descent
Association football midfielders
Allsvenskan players
Ettan Fotboll players
Örebro SK players
IFK Värnamo players